Darantasia is a genus of moths in the family Erebidae. The genus was erected by Francis Walker in 1859.

Species

References

Heppner, J. B. (2010). "Notes on Vietnam moths, 16. A new Darantasia from Vietnam (Lepidoptera: Arctiidae: Lithosiinae)". Lepidoptera Novae (Gainesville). 3 (4): 255–258.

External links

Nudariina
Moth genera